Fiddian is a surname. Notable people with the surname include:

Charles Fiddian-Green (1898–1976), British cricketer
Nic Fiddian-Green (born 1963), British sculptor
Samuel Fiddian (1842–1904), Australian headmaster
William Fiddian Moulton (1835–1898), British Methodist minister